Talal Al-Shila (Arabic:طلال شلة) (born 2 December 1991) is a Qatari footballer. He currently plays as a midfielder for Al-Markhiya .

Career
He formerly played for Al-Shamal, Al-Markhiya, and Umm Salal.

External links

References

Living people
1991 births
Qatari footballers
Al-Shamal SC players
Al-Markhiya SC players
Umm Salal SC players
Qatar Stars League players
Qatari Second Division players
Association football midfielders
Place of birth missing (living people)